"Lonely Drum" is a song co-written and recorded by Canadian-American country artist Aaron Goodvin. It was the second single from Goodvin's debut self-titled studio album. Goodvin and his co-writers won "Songwriter of the Year" at the 2018 CCMA Awards for the song.

Background
Goodvin and co-writer Catt Gravitt were writing a song called "Trying to Forget You", and after finishing it, Gravitt said "I just love that song because it beats on that lonely drum". Goodvin remarked that he immediately wanted to write a song with that title, "Lonely Drum", and it took them around 45 minutes to complete it. He said that after three years of pitching the song, he recorded it himself, and was very happy with the reaction from fans and radio stations.

Commercial performance
"Lonely Drum" reached a peak of #8 on the Billboard Canada Country chart., and #95 on the Canadian Hot 100. It has been certified Double Platinum by Music Canada. It reached a peak of #45 on the US Country Indicator chart.

Music video
The official music video for "Lonely Drum" premiered on July 26, 2017. Due to the song's popularity, its lyric video was viewed over a million times on YouTube prior to the release of the official music video.

Charts

Certifications

Notes

References

2017 songs
2017 singles
2021 singles
Aaron Goodvin songs
Warner Music Group singles
Songs written by Aaron Goodvin